The City of Enfield (formerly District Council of Yatala South) was a local government area of South Australia from 1868 to 1996. It was known as Yatala South up until 1933, which was named for its local government area predecessor, the District Council of Yatala, and known as Enfield thereafter.

In 1868, the council area ranged approximately from Dry Creek in the north to the River Torrens in the south east and Torrens Road (unrelated to the river) in the south west.

History

Early years

The District Council of Yatala South was established on 18 June 1868 when the District Council of Yatala was divided at Dry Creek and the Dry Creek-Port Adelaide railway line into Yatala South and Yatala North. The council office was located near  Gepps Cross intersection at the northern end of the suburb of Enfield.

The division still did not satisfy everyone, as the council had trouble collecting rates from the rural north-western areas; and Prospect ratepayers who did pay, believed they were not getting their fair share of roadworks and that the council office was too far away at Gepps Cross. Led by council member James Harrington, Prospect Village residents petitioned for separation from Yatala South, and on 1 August 1872 part was severed to form the new District Council of Prospect.

In 1927 the second Enfield council chamber, located on Regency Road, Enfield was erected.

In 1930, the recorded population of Yatala South was 4,979.

Well over half a century since its establishment, on 22 June 1933, Yatala South was renamed to be the District Council of Enfield following lobbying from residents. The district council was now named after its major population centre and council seat, the township of Enfield.

Municipality
In April 1944 the Enfield council was granted municipal status, becoming the Town of Enfield. In January 1953, the population had reached a point where the municipality was granted city status and known thereafter as the City of Enfield. The chairman of the council became the mayor from 1944.

In March 1996 the City of Enfield merged with the City of Port Adelaide to form the City of Port Adelaide Enfield.

Chairmen and mayors

Yatala South (Chairman)
 G. W. W. Sudholz (1868–1876)
 John Williams (1876-1885)
 J. L. Thompson (1885-1886)
 George Morris (1886-1889)
 Robert Emery (1889-1893)
 John Francis (1893-1895)
 John Duncanson (1895-1896)
 James R. Musson (1896-1897)
 Andrew W. Shillabeer (1897-1899)
 James R. Musson (1899-1901)
 William Duthie (1904-1905)
 John Williams (1905-1908)
 Andrew W. Shillabeer (1908-1922)
 William Duthie (?)
 Thomas Keith Shutter (1931–1933)

Enfield
 Thomas Keith Shutter (1933–1938)
 Arthur George Owen Gray (1938–1943)
 Keith Teller (1943–1944)
 Harold Frank Stevens (1944–1947)
 Thomas Keith Shutter (1947–1955)
 Thomas Turner (1955–1964)
 Joseph Robert Chaplin (1964–1968)
 Roy Donald Amer (1968–1971)
 Ray J Norton (1971–1974)
 (1974–1976) ?
 Ray J Norton (1976–1988)
 Ronald Henry Charles Bonner (1988–1989)
 Roy Donald Amer (1989–1993)
 Michael Charles Stock (1993–1996)

See also
 Clearview, South Australia
 Klemzig, South Australia
 Hampstead Gardens, South Australia
 Regency Park, South Australia
 Angle Park, South Australia
 Ferryden Park, South Australia

Notes

1868 establishments in Australia
1996 disestablishments in Australia
Enfield, City of